The New English Library was a United Kingdom book publishing company, which became an imprint of Hodder Headline.

History 
New English Library (NEL) was created in 1961 by the Times Mirror Company of Los Angeles, with the takeover of two small British paperback companies, Ace Books Ltd and Four Square Books Ltd, as a complement to its 1960 acquisition of New American Library in the United States. NEL's top bestseller of the 1960s was The Carpetbaggers by Harold Robbins.

The imprint was sold in 1981 to Hodder & Stoughton, and became part of the merged Hodder Headline in 1993.

It has published genres such as fantasy, science fiction, mystery and suspense. They have published the works of Stephen King, Harold Robbins, James Herbert and science fiction authors have included Brian Aldiss, Frank Herbert, Robert A. Heinlein, Michael Moorcock and Christopher Priest. New English Library titles were particularly popular in the early 1970s, when hack writers  were hired to work under names such as Richard Allen and  Mick Norman to churn out tales of Hells Angels and skinheads. These older New English Library books have some cult following, especially in the UK.

The brand continued as a mass-market imprint for Hodder Headline, focussing on thrillers and horror, until 2004 when it was dropped following Hodder's assimilation into the Hachette Livre group, and a single Hodder & Stoughton paperback list was created, combining the NEL titles then in print with those in Hodder's previous Coronet (mainstream) and Flame (young and contemporary) paperback lines.

References

Further reading
 Justin Marriott (ed.), A Visual Guide To New English Library: Volume One (Nov. 2010) A5, 88pp.

Book publishing companies of the United Kingdom